Quintus Dellius was a Roman commander and politician in the second half of the 1st century BC.  His family was of equestrian rank in the Roman social system of status.

Life 
Dellius was a political opportunist and was called desultor bellorum civilium (horse changer of the civil war) by Marcus Valerius Messalla Corvinus. He received this name because he deserted from Publius Cornelius Dolabella to Gaius Cassius Longinus in 43 BC, from Cassius to Mark Antony in 42 BC, and finally  from Antony to Octavian in 31 BC.

For more than ten years, Dellius was an intimate friend of Antony, who used him mainly for diplomatic missions.  In 41 BC, he travelled on Antony's orders to Alexandria to summon the Egyptian queen, Cleopatra VII, to Tarsus in Cilicia. There she was to answer for the money that she allegedly had sent to Gaius Cassius for his war against Antony and Octavian.  In 40 BC or 39 BC, Antony sent him to Judaea to help Herod the Great with the expulsion of the usurper Antigonus.  In 36 BC or 35 BC, Dellius negotiated with Herod to persuade the Jewish king to appoint the young brother of his wife Mariamne, Aristobulus, high priest.  Dellius also participated in Antony's campaign against the Parthian Empire in 36 BC.  Two years later he was instructed to persuade the Armenian king Artavasdes II to wed his four-year-old daughter to the six-year-old Alexander Helios, the son of Antony and Cleopatra VII.  It is doubtful if this diplomatic mission was serious because soon after Antony marched to the Armenian capital Artaxata and arrested the Armenian king and his family.

Dellius liked to make mocking remarks and he was allegedly the matchmaker for Antony to satisfy his erotic passions. Therefore, Cleopatra despised him.

When Antony fought his last war against Octavian (31 BC), Dellius accompanied his superior to Greece, recruiting reinforcements for Antony in Macedonia and Thrace as the situation deteriorated.  Just before the Battle of Actium, Dellius changed sides, and betrayed Antony's plans to Octavian.  He justified his changeover due to his fear that Cleopatra VII wanted to murder him.  He was held in high regard by Octavian.   According to the commentator Porphyrio, the poet Horace addressed an ode (2.3) to Dellius.

Dellius also wrote a historical work that dealt with Antony's war against Parthia, in which he had participated.  Therefore, it is often assumed that he was the source of Plutarch and Strabo in their account of this campaign.

Fictional portrayals
Quintus Dellius is portrayed in Colleen McCullough's Antony and Cleopatra and the play Cleopatra: A Life Unparalleled as an unprincipled friend of Mark Antony.

Notes

References 

 Georg Wissowa: Dellius, Q. In: Realencyclopädie der Classischen Altertumswissenschaft, vol. 4, 2 (1903), col. 2447–2448.

1st-century BC Romans
Ancient Roman generals
Ancient Roman politicians